Blow Your Cool! is the third studio album by Australian rock group Hoodoo Gurus. It was released in April 1987 and peaked at number 2 on the Australian chart.

In 2009, Dave Faulkner said "When the Blow Your Cool! touring was over Clyde retired from the road and the band. At this point we persuaded Rick Grossman to join, contributing his tremendous bass skills to the band, and so we had reached what was to be our ultimate line-up. After that we only changed our haircuts (and underwear)." .

EMI re-released the album on February 6, 2005 with four additional tracks, a fold out poster and liner notes by Vicki Peterson of the Bangles. One of the additional tracks, "The Generation Gap" was their first recording with Grossman, and had been released as a single-only in 1988; it was their cover of Jeannie C. Riley's 1970 country song.

Reception
Cash Box magazine said "Australia's good rocking band is back with their most cohesive set to date. With help from LA’s Bangles and Dream Syndicate, the LP has an American flavour likely to touch off a tidal wave of interest at progressive retail outlets and alternative and/or adventurous radio."

Track listing

Personnel 
Credited to:

Hoodoo Gurus 
 Dave Faulkner – lead vocals, guitar, keyboards
 Brad Shepherd – guitar, harmonica
 Mark Kingsmill – drums
 Clyde Bramley – bass

Additional musicians 
 The Bangles (Susanna Hoffs, Debbi Peterson, Vicki Peterson, Michael Steele) – background vocals (tracks 3 & 12)
 The Calamity Bake Sails
 Dream Syndicate members Steve Wynn & Mark Walton – background vocals (track 7)
 Mike Kloster (engineer for the Bangles) – background vocals (track 12)
 Stevo Glendinning – background vocals (track 12)
 Mark Opitz – background vocals (track 12)
 Geoff Rhoe – background vocals (tracks 6 & 12)
 Paul Thirkell – background vocals (track 7)
 Allan Wright – background vocals (track 12)
 Malcolm Eastick (Stars, Broderick Smith's Big Combo) – guitar (track 1)
 James Valentine (Models) – saxophone (tracks 4 & 10)

Production details 
 Richard Allan – Art Direction, Cover Design
 Allan Wright – Engineer
 Heidi Cannavo, Kathy Nauton, Paula Jones, Tchad Blake — Assistant Engineers
 Mark Opitz – Producer
 Barry Diament – Mastering

Charts

Certifications

References 

Hoodoo Gurus albums
1987 albums
Albums produced by Mark Opitz